"As Long as You're Loving Me" is a single by Vitamin C released in 2001. This was the second and final single taken from her second album More. It was written by Shelly Peiken and Guy Roche. The song was also included on the 2001 soundtrack to the comedy film See Spot Run.

Composition
It is written in D major with a key change to E major at the 3-minute-and-6-second mark.

Reception 
The single for "As Long as You're Loving Me" peaked at number 45 on the New Zealand RIANZ Charts. The single failed to chart in the US.

Music video 
The music video for "As Long as You're Loving Me" shows Vitamin C singing to scenes from the movie See Spot Run.

Track listing 
"As Long as You're Loving Me" (remix)
"As Long as You're Loving Me" (radio edit)
"As Long as You're Loving Me" (album version)
"She Talks About Love" (album version)

Promo CD
"As Long as You're Loving Me" (Remix) – 4:16
"As Long as You're Loving Me" (Original Version-Radio Edit) – 3:53

Charts

References 

2001 singles
2001 songs
Vitamin C (singer) songs
Songs written by Guy Roche
Songs written by Shelly Peiken
2000 songs
Elektra Records singles
Pop ballads
2000s ballads